Ancylomenes is a genus of shrimp, erected in 2010 to accommodate the group of species around "Periclimenes aesopius" (now Ancylomenes aesopius). Members of the genus are widely distributed in the warm oceans of the world, and live in association with cnidarians; most are cleaner shrimp.

The genus Ancylomenes contains the following species:

Ancylomenes adularans (Bruce, 2003)
Ancylomenes aesopius (Spence Bate, 1863)
Ancylomenes amirantei (Bruce, 2007)
Ancylomenes aqabai (Bruce, 2008)
Ancylomenes grandidens (Bruce, 2005)
Ancylomenes holthuisi (Bruce, 1969)
Ancylomenes kobayashii (Okuno & Nomura, 2002)
Ancylomenes kuboi Bruce, 2010
Ancylomenes longicarpus (Bruce & Svoboda, 1983)
Ancylomenes lucasi (Chace, 1937)
Ancylomenes luteomaculatus Okuno & Bruce, 2010
Ancylomenes magnificus (Bruce, 1979)
Ancylomenes okunoi Bruce, 2010
Ancylomenes pedersoni (Chace, 1958)
Ancylomenes sarasvati (Okuno, 2002)
Ancylomenes speciosus (Okuno, 2004)
Ancylomenes tenuirostris (Bruce, 1991)
Ancylomenes tosaensis (Kubo, 1951)
Ancylomenes venustus (Bruce, 1989)

References

External links

Palaemonoidea